Kamnem po golove (literally Stone onto a Head) is the debut album of Russian rock group Korol i Shut, released in 1996.

Track listing
Source: Official site

References

1996 debut albums
Korol i Shut albums